Sougwen Chung (鍾愫君) is a Chinese-born, Canadian-raised artist residing in London. Chung's artistic practices are based on performance, drawing, still image, sculpture, and installation. Chung's work investigates mark-made-by-machine and mark-made-by-hand for understanding the encounter of computers and humans.

Early life
Chung grew up in Toronto, Canada, and Hong Kong. Their father, an opera singer, made sure that his children had experience with musical instruments at a very young age, and Chung grew up playing violin and piano. Sougwen Chung moved to the United States as a teenager and received a Bachelor of Fine Arts from Indiana University before obtaining a Masters Diploma in Interactive Art from Hyper Island in Sweden.

Career
Chung's work has been shown at galleries and museums across the world, including EMMA (museum) in Espoo, Finland, MAMCO in Geneva, Switzerland, Vancouver Art Gallery in Canada, and Istanbul's Akbank Sanat. Chung has spoken globally at conferences including Tribeca Film Festival, New York; The Hospital Club, London; MUTEK Festival, Montreal & Mexico City; Sónar +D, Barcelona; The Art Directors Club, New York; Stockholm; SXSW, Austin; Tokyo; Internet Dargana, Barcelona: FITC; New York; OFFF, Barcelona; Gray Area Festival, San Francisco; and SIGGRAPH, Vancouver. 

Sougwen Chung's work has also been featured in multiple international press outlets including The New Yorker, Art F City, Artnet, Artsy, Dazed and Confused, The Creators Project, MASHABLE, EXIT Magazine, Engadget, Business Insider, Fast Company and USA Today.

An example of their work is the 2017 "Drawing Operations Unit." It is an exploration into how machine learning might be applied to the drawing style of the artist's hand. The robotic arm's behavior is generated from neural nets trained on the artist's drawing gestures. In a sense, the robotic arm has learned from the visual style of the artist's previous drawings and outputs a machine interpretation during the human/robot drawing duet.

Chung is a former researcher at MIT's Media Lab and an inaugural member of NEW INC, the first museum-led technology and art in collaboration with The New Museum. According to the World Science Festival 2018, they are an Artist-In-Residence at Bell Labs exploring new forms of drawing in virtual reality, with biometrics, machine learning, and robotics.

In 2019 Chung presented a talk at TED@BCG Mumbai titled "Why I draw with robots".

In 2022, Chung's work MEMORY (Drawing Operations Unit Generation 2) was acquired by the Victoria and Albert Museum in London. The acquisition of MEMORY comprises a fine art print, a film documenting the artist’s process, and a Recurrent Neural Network (RNN) model contained within a 3D printed sculpture.

Selected works

Assembly Lines (Drawing Operations Unit: Generation 5) (2022) — A performative installation featuring a custom multi-robotic system driven by meditation and biofeedback.
Flora Rearing Agricultural Network (F.R.A.N.) (2020) — A performance and exhibition featuring the creation of a speculative blueprint for a new robotic network connected to nature.
Exquisite Corpus (2019) — A performance installation exploring the feedback loop between bodies — the human body, the machinic body, and ecological bodies.
Omnia per Omnia (Drawing Operations Unit: Generation 3) (2018) — Collaborative drawing performance exploring the composite agency of an human and machine as a speculation on new pluralities.
Memory (Drawing Operations Unit: Generation 2) (2017) — Performance involving robotic memory.
Mimicry (Drawing Operations Unit: Generation 1) (2015) — An ongoing collaboration between an artist and a robotic arm.
Embryo (Étude OP. 5, No. 5) (2015) — Mixed media, commissioned by OFFF for OFFF Unmasked.
Praesentia (2015) — "As a pencil moves about the paper, its path is local and confined; freed from the need to consider the totality, it can respond immediately to “where the hand is now in praesentia.".
Praesentia Sculptures (2013) — 3D printed drawn sculptural prototypes printed in gold, made with custom software. Exhibited at the MIT Media Lab 2013. Currently, they are prototypes for a forthcoming series examining dimensional mark making.

References

Living people
Indiana University alumni
Year of birth missing (living people)
21st-century Chinese women artists
21st-century Chinese artists
Artificial intelligence art
New media artists
New media art